Gunderslevholm is a manor house and estate located 1+ km northwest of Næstved in southeastern Denmark. It has been owned by members of the de Neergaard family since 1803. The main building is located on high ground just west of the Suså river. It was originally a Baroque-style mansion built in 1729 for Carl Adolf von Plessen but was in 17887 adapted to the Neoclassical style. The estate covers 1,936 hectares (2020)

History

Early history
Gunderslevholm was in the Middle Ages located in the village of Gunderslevmagle, The manor was in the beginning of the 14th century owned by Niels Pedersen who passed it on to his sons Peder Nielsen and Jens Nielsen. Jens Nielsen sold it to Johannes Mogensen Grubbe, a district judge of Zealand, in 1333. Grubbe constructed a fortified house on the estate but it was destroyed by Valdemar IV's troops just a few years later, probably because Grubbe had sided with Holstein, in their conflict with the Danish king. He was killed on the third day of the action. Gunderslev was then passed on to his three sons, Mogens Jens Grubbe (later bishop of Børglum), Esbern Rage Grubbe and Bent Biug Grubbe, who had all remained loyal to the king. Bent Biug Grubbe, who later became the sol owner of the estate, served as hofmeister for Olaf II of Denmark.  His son Jens died without children in 1405. His sister, Cecilie, was married to Tyge Basse. Their daughter was married to Ove Jacobsen Lunge, whose daughter Ellen Ovesdatter Lunge married Axel Lagesen Brok.

Gøye family
 
Mogens Gøye's first wife, Mette Bydelsbak, the daughter of Albrecht Engelbrechtsen Bydelsbak and Pernille Brock, was the last surviving member of her family after her brother had died in Dithmarschen. Gunderslevholm therefore passed to him when Axel Lagesen Brokin 1498 . He constructed a new main building in circa  1530.

When Mogens Gøye died in 1544, Gunderslevholm was initially passed to his second eldest son, Rskil Gøye, but he died without children in 1560. Gunderslevholm was therefore passed on to his elder brother,  Christoffer Gøye. who served in the war against Sweden in 1564-65. He died in Viborg in 1584 but is buried in Gunderslev Church. His son and only child had died back in 1550 and Gunderslevholm was there passed to his nephew, Mogens Gøye, a son of his younger brother Falk Gøye. Mogens Gøye was as headmaster of Herlufsholm School from 1609.

Krabbe family
 
Mogens Gøye the Younger's son, Christoffer Gøye, in 631 sold Gunderslevholm to Ejler Urne. Urne's son-in-law, Flemming Ulfeldt, in 1647 sold it to Iver Krabbe. Frederik III (1609-70) made him Governor-General of Norway. He died on the Gunderslevholm estate on 30 October 1666. Gunderslevholm remained in the hans of the Krabbe family until 1693.

Changing owners
Birgitte Reedtz, the widow of Markor Rodsteen, purchased Hunderslevholm at auction in 1693. Reedtz' heir, Christian Rodsteen, a foster son, sold Hunderslevholm to Elisabeth Sophie von Holstein in 1707. She served as lady-in-waiting for the queen.  She sold Gunderslevholm to a court priest, Hector Gottfried Masius, but he died shortly thereafter. The family was ennobled under the name von der Maase in 1712. Christian von der Maase expanded the estate with more land.
buried

Carl Adolph von Plessen
 
Carl Adolph von Plessen bought the estate in 1725. Plessen constructed a new main building in 1729 and expanded the estate through the acquisition of new land. He improved the living conditions for the peasants on his estates, for instance through the construction of schools.

He later included the estate in the Plessenske Fideikommis. The legal effect of a fideikommis was that the estate could not be sold, mortgaged or divided between heirs. The Plessenske Fideikommis struggled economically and was converted from land to capital when the estates were sold in 1803.

Neergaard family
 
The new owner of Gunderslevholm was Peter Johansen de Neergaard. He died on the estate in 1835 but had by then already ceded it to his second-oldest son, Carl de Neergaard. He had no children and left Gunderslevholm to his nephew Johan Thomas Oluf de Neergaard. He was succeeded on the estate by his son Ferdinand Lorenz de Neergaard.

Architecture
 
The two storey main building is nine bays wide. The facade is tipped by a triangular pediment. The hipped roof is clad with blue-glazed tile.

Today
The current owner is Claus Johan Thomas de Neergaard. The estate covers 1,777 hectares (2014).

List of owners
 ( - ) Niels Pedersen 
 ( -1333) Peder Nielsen 
 ( -1333) Jens Nielsen 
 (1333-1345) Johannes Mogensen Grubbe 
 (1345-1348) Esbern Rage Grubbe 
 (1345-1369) Mogens Jens Grubbe 
 (1345-1391) Bent Biug Grubbe 
 (1391-1405) Jens Grubbe 
 (1391-1408) Tyge Basse 
 (1408-1458) Ove Jacobsen Lunge 
 (1458-1498) Axel Lagesen Brok 
 (1498-1544) Mogens Gøye 
 (1544-1560) Eskild Gøye 
 (1560-1584) Christoffer Gøye 
 (1584-1615) Mogens Gøye 
 (1615-1631) Christoffer Gøye 
 (1631-1640) Ejler Urne 
 (1640-1647) Flemming Ulfeldt 
 (1647-1666) Iver Krabbe 
 (1666-1676) Tage Krabbe 
 (1676-1693) Boet efter Tage Krabbe 
 (1693-1699) Birgitte Reedtz, gift Rodsteen 
 (1699-1707) Christian Rodsteen 
 (1707-1709) Elisabeth Sophie von Holstein 
 (1709-1719) The heirs of Hector Gottfried Masius
 (1719-1725) Christian von der Maase 
 (1725-1758) Carl Adolph von Plessen
 (1758-1803) Carl Adolph von Plessen
 (1803-1835) Peter Johansen de Neergaard 
 (1835-1850) Carl de Neergaard 
 (1850-1921) Johan Thomas Oluf de Neergaard 
 (1921-1938) Ferdinand Lorenz de Neergaard 
 (1938-1947) Marie Henriette Dorothea Hansen, gift de Neergaard 
 (1947-2006) Rolf Viggo de Neergaard 
 (1981- ) Claus Johan Thomas de Neergaard

References

External links

Official website
 Foreningen af den gunderslevholmske gren af slægten Neergaard

Listed buildings and structures in Næstved Municipality
Listed castles and manor houses in Denmark
Manor houses in Næstved Municipality
Neoclassical architecture in Denmark
Houses completed in 1787